Rhos railway station was a station in Rhosllannerchrugog, Wrexham, Wales on the Shrewsbury and Chester Railway. It was located in a remote spot almost a mile to the east of Rhosllannerchrugog, to the south of a road overbridge which carried Corkscrew Lane, in Pentre Bychan, over the line. The station was opened on 14 October 1848 and closed in March 1855. No trace of this station remains today.

It is not to be confused with another station by the same name which was actually in the village of Rhosllannerchrugog, on the Rhos Branch line from Wrexham through Legacy.

References

Disused railway stations in Wrexham County Borough
Railway stations in Great Britain opened in 1848
Railway stations in Great Britain closed in 1855
Former Great Western Railway stations